The 97th Massachusetts General Court, consisting of the Massachusetts Senate and the Massachusetts House of Representatives, met in 1876 during the governorship of Alexander H. Rice. George B. Loring served as president of the Senate and John Davis Long served as speaker of the House.

Members earned a salary of $650 per year.

Senators

Representatives

See also
 1876 Massachusetts gubernatorial election
 44th United States Congress
 List of Massachusetts General Courts

References

Further reading
  (includes description of legislature)

External links
 
 

Political history of Massachusetts
Massachusetts legislative sessions
massachusetts
1876 in Massachusetts